The campo miner (Geositta poeciloptera) is a species of bird in the family Furnariidae.

It is found in Brazil and far northeastern Bolivia. Its natural habitat is dry savanna. It is threatened by habitat loss.

References

External links
Image at ADW

campo miner
Birds of Brazil
campo miner
Taxonomy articles created by Polbot